The Sustainment Command (Expeditionary), commonly referred to as an "ESC",  is a United States Army logistics headquarters. Sustainment is "the provision of logistics, financial management, personnel services, and health service support necessary to maintain operations until successful mission completion."

The Sustainment Command (Expeditionary), commanded by a Brigadier General, is task-organized with one or more Sustainment Brigades, Transportation Brigades, and/or Movement Control Battalion's for theater opening, theater distribution, or theater closing operations.  It commands and controls all assigned and attached units as directed by the Sustainment Command (Theater).

Expeditionary sustainment commands

References

External links
 The Institute of Heraldry

Sustainment Commands of the United States Army